1000 Block of Seventh Street and 649–651 New York Avenue NW are a collection of two and three story buildings  in Washington D.C. which were listed on the National Register of Historic Places in 1984.   They are located across the street from the Walter E. Washington Convention Center and adjacent to Mount Vernon Square, also listed on the NRHP.

The buildings were mostly built in the 1870s for a German immigrant population.   They have remained mostly intact since they were built even though the neighborhood around them has changed dramatically.

References

Commercial buildings on the National Register of Historic Places in Washington, D.C.
Italianate architecture in Washington, D.C.